Cardamyla is a genus of snout moths. It was described by Francis Walker in 1859 and is known from Australia.

Species
 Cardamyla carinentalis Walker, 1859
 Cardamyla didymalis Walker, 1859
 Cardamyla eurycroca Turner, 1937
 Cardamyla hercophora (Meyrick, 1884)

References

Pyralini
Pyralidae genera